List of compositions by Johann Baptist Wanhal.

Concertos

Published
4 Sinfonie Concertanti (Paris, 1775)
"A favourite" Concerto for the German Flute or Violin (London, c.1775)
6 Harpsichord Concertos:
Concerto for Harpsichord No.1 (Wien, 1785)
Concerto for Harpsichord No.2 (London, 1788)
Concerto for Harpsichord No.3 (London, 1788)
Concerto for Harpsichord No.4 (Offenbach, 1789)
Concerto for Harpsichord No.5 (Mainz, 1780)
Concerto for Harpsichord No.6 (Wien, 1808)
1 Concertino for Harpsichord (Wien, s.a.)
3 Concertos for Flute (Bailleux, Paris, c.1782):
Flute Concerto No.1 in A major
Flute Concerto No.2 in B-flat major
Flute Concerto No.3 in E major / E-flat major
2 Viola Concertos:
Concerto for Viola in C major (Prague: Artia/Supraphon 1973 ed V. Blazek & J. Plichta Musica Viva Historica No.10)
Concerto for Viola in F major (Vienna: Doblinger, c.1978. ed Weinmann, Alexander, Karl Trotzmuller)

Manuscripts
Concerto for Harpsichord and Violin
Concertos for Harpsichord (or Piano) (the exact number of which is still unknown)
2 Concertos for Harpsichord (or Organ)
Organ Concerto
Concerto for 2 Violins
5 Violin Concertos
2 Concertos for Cello:
Cello Concerto in C major (WeiV IId:C1 - Possibly the same work as Viola Concerto in C)
Cello Concerto in A major
2 Concertos for Flute:
Flute Concerto No.1 in D major (MS.1, WeiV IIe:D1, Lund University Library; now publ. Artaria)
Flute Concerto No.2 in E-flat major (MS.2, WeiV IIe:Eb1, The Danish Royal Library Mu.6304.2368; now publ. Artaria)
2 Concertos for Viola (see also Published section):
Viola Concerto in F major (c.1785) [original version for Bassoon and orchestra (c.1780), transcription by the composer-
Viola Concerto in C major (WeiV IId:C1 - Possibly the same work as Cello Concerto in C)
Double-bass Concerto in D major (1773) (played also in E or E-flat major)
Clarinet Concerto, originally Flute Concerto IIe:C1 (ed. G. Balassa and M. Berlész: Budapest, 1972)
Concerto for 2 Bassoons in F major (ed. H. Voxman: Monteux, 1985), also attributed to Zimmermann
Bassoon Concerto in С major (piano score arr. by K.M. Schwamberger: Hamburg, 1964)
Bassoon Concerto in С major No. 2 (pub. Hans-Peter Vogel, 2016)
Bassoon Concerto in F major, WeiV IIi:F2 (published in Diletto musicale, no.537, Vienna, 1978)

Symphonies
Wanhal left 51 published symphonies. There are also another 81 symphonies which are preserved only in manuscripts. [according to the catalogue published by Civra Ferruccio, Torino 1985]. Even though the modern actual French spelling of Symphonie Périodique is Symphonie Périodique, the original 18th century French title of such works was Simphonie Periodique, as it can be seen on the 18th century frontispiece of Wanhal's published symphonies "a Amsterdam chez J.J. Hummel, Marchand & Imprimeur de Musique".

Published
4 Symphonies, Op. 10 (Paris, 1771–72)
3 Symphonies, Op. 10 (Paris, 1773)
3 Symphonies, Op. 16 (Paris, 1773)
2 Symphonies, Op. 17 (Paris, 1773)
1 Symphony (Paris, 1778)
3 Symphonies, Op. 10 (Amsterdam, ca. 1783)
1 Symphony, Op. 10 (Offenbach, s.a.)
34 Symphonies Périodiques (Amsterdam)

Selection of best known symphonies
Symphony in A major, Bryan A2
Symphony In A major, Bryan A4
Symphony in A major, Bryan A9
Symphony in A minor, Bryan a1
Symphony in A minor, Bryan a2
Symphony in A flat major, Bryan As1
Symphony in B flat major, Bs1
Symphony in B flat major, Bs3
Symphony in C major, Bryan C1
Symphony in C major, Bryan C3
Symphony in C major (Comista), Bryan C11
Symphony in C major, Bryan C17
Symphony in C minor, Bryan c2
Symphony in D major, Bryan D2
Symphony in D major, Bryan D4
Symphony in D major, Bryan D17
Symphony in D minor, Bryan d1
Symphony in D minor, Bryan d2
Symphony in E minor, Bryan e1
Symphony in E minor, Bryan e3
Symphony in E flat major, Bryan Es1
Symphony in F major, Bryan F5
Symphony in G major, Bryan G6
Symphony in G major, Bryan G8
Symphony in G major, Bryan G11
Symphony in G minor, Bryan g1
Symphony in G minor, Bryan g2

Chamber music
6 Viola Sonatas (4 as Op.5, 2 others in E-flat major and G major)
3 Violin Sonatas, Op.43:
Sonata No.1 in G major
Sonata No.2 in B♭ major
Sonata No.3 in D minor
6 Violin Sonatas (WeiV Xa:8-13)
String Trios:
6 Sonatas for 2 Violins and Cello, Op.12
1. Sonata in B♭ major
2. Sonata in F minor
3. Sonata in A major
4. Sonata in E major
5. Sonata in G major
6. Sonata in E♭ major
6 Sonatas for 2 Violins and Cello Op.17 (c.1780)
Clarinet Sonatas
Clarinet Sonata in C Major
Clarinet Sonata in Bb Major
Piano Trios:
Trio Op.20 No.1
Trio Op.20 No.2
Trio Op.20 No.3
Trio Op.20 No.5 for clarinet, violin and piano
3 Piano Quartets:
Piano Quartet in E flat major, Op.40 No.1
Piano Quartet in G major, Op.40 No.2
Piano Quartet in B flat major, Op.40 No.3
6 Oboe (or Flute) Quartets, Op.7 (1771):
Quartet No.1 in F major
Quartet No.2 in B♭ major
Quartet No.3 in G major
Quartet No.4 in E♭ major
Quartet No.5 in A major
Quartet No.6 in C major
Caper Quartet:
Caper Quartet in G major, Op.4 No.1
String Quartets:
String Quartet in E-flat major, WoO
6 String Quartets, Op.6
6 String Quartets, Op.13
6 String Quartets, Op.21
String Quintets, for 2 Violins, 2 Violas and Cello (RISM A/I:V362) (1774):
Quintet No.1 in D major
Quintet No.2 in E♭ major
Quintet No.3 in G major
Quintet No.4 in F major
Quintet No.5 in G major
Quintet No.6 in D major

Operas
These works were written during Wanhal's journey to Italy, where they were written after he had met Florian Gassmann. Sources do not agree whether Wanhal wrote the operas in their entirety, or merely supplied arias to operas by Gassmann. Both works are lost.

Il Demofoonte (Metastasio; Roma, 1770)
Il trionfo di Clelia (Metastasio; Roma, 1770)

Sacred music

Published
2 Masses (C major and G major, Wien, s.a.)
2 Offertories (Wien, s.a.)
Pange Lingua (Wien, s.a.)
IV breves et faciles Hymni in honorem SS. Altari Sacramenti (Wien, s.a.)

Manuscripts
58 Masses:
(MS 1-G major Missa Pastoralis ca. 1782: Weinmann XIX: G4, Austrian National Library Mus.Hs.926)
(MS 2-C major Missa Solemnis ca. 1778: Weinmann XIX: C7, Austrian National Library Mus.Hs.22290)
Both the Masses are now publ. Artaria.
1 Credo
Kyrie and Gloria
54 Offertories
16 Salve Regina
10 litanies
14 motets
Stabat Mater
Te Deum
Tantum ergo
Pange Lingua
Quatro stationi
Sacrum Solenne
31 arias

References

Wanhal, Johann Baptist